Irmantas Stumbrys (30 May 1972 – 16 November 2000) was a Lithuanian football player who played as a midfielder. He has played for a number of first division Lithuanian teams and for some Russian sides including Zenit.

Club career
He started his career at Ekranas Panevėžys and played for Kareda-Sakalas Šiauliai before moving abroad to join Russian giants Zenit St. Petersburg in 1997. He had just won promotion to the Russian Premier League with Torpedo-ZIL before his death.

International career
Stumbrys made his debut for Lithuania in a November 1991 Baltic Cup match against Latvia and earned a total of 37 caps, scoring 2 goals. His final international was an October 1999 European Championship qualifying match against Scotland.

Death
He died in November 2000 after getting shot in his head in Panevėžys, Lithuania. His body was found in his car. His death was considered suicide after police investigations.

He was survived by his wife and his son.

Honours
Baltic Cup
 1992, 1998

References

External links
 

1972 births
2000 deaths
Lithuanian footballers
Lithuanian expatriate footballers
Lithuania international footballers
FC Zenit Saint Petersburg players
FC Moscow players
Expatriate footballers in Russia
Russian Premier League players
Stumbrys
FK Kareda Kaunas players
Association football midfielders
Suicides by firearm in Lithuania
2000 suicides
FC Zenit-2 Saint Petersburg players